Guelmim is a province in the Moroccan economic region of Guelmim-Oued Noun. Its population in 2004 was 166,685. 

The major cities and towns are: 
 Bouizakarne
 Guelmim
 Taghjijt
 Ifrane Atlas Saghir

Subdivisions
The province is divided administratively into the following:

References

 
Guelmim Province